Luis Olmo (August 11, 1919 – April 28, 2017) was a major league baseball outfielder and right-handed batter. Olmo played in the majors with the Brooklyn Dodgers (1943–45, 1949) and Boston Braves (1950–51).

Early years
Olmo (birth name: Luis Francisco Rodríguez Olmo ) was born in Arecibo, Puerto Rico. He began his professional career in 1938 with the Criollos de Caguas of the Puerto Rican Winter League. In 1939, Olmo signed with the Richmond Colts of the Piedmont League and was assigned to the Tarboro Goobers and later the Wilson Tobs of the Coastal Plain League. The Dodgers acquired Olmo from Richmond in 1942 and assigned him to the Montreal Royals after spring training.

Major League career
Brooklyn called Olmo up to the major leagues in July 1943 and he debuted with the Dodgers on July 18, 1943. In 57 games, he batted .303 with four home runs and 37 RBI. He gained regular status in the next season, batting .258 with nine home runs and 85 RBI in 136 games.

On May 18, 1945, Olmo became the second player (Del Bissonette on April 21, 1930, was the first) in Major League history to hit a bases-loaded triple and a bases-loaded home run (grand slam) in the same game. He added a single for good measure, only failing to hit a double to complete the cycle. In that season, he led the league in triples (13) and reached career-high numbers in batting average (.313), home runs (10), RBI (110), doubles (27), stolen bases (15) and games (141).

Mexican League
In 1946, Olmo was among a group of players enticed to play in the Mexican League with the promise of higher salaries; they were suspended by Baseball Commissioner Happy Chandler for jumping the major leagues. Two years later, Olmo was reinstated and he returned to the Dodgers, batting .305 in 1949 to help win the pennant.

1949 World Series
In the 1949 World Series against the Yankees, Olmo became the first Puerto Rican to play in a World Series, as well as hit a home run and get three hits in a Series game. After two seasons, he was dealt to the Braves. He retired at the end of the 1951 season.

In a six-year career, Olmo batted .281 (458-for-1629) with 29 home runs, 208 runs, 65 doubles, 25 triples, and 33 stolen bases in 462 games.

Caribbean Series
Olmo earned Caribbean Series MVP honors, during the 1951 edition played in Caracas, after batting .416 and three homers, while powering the Cangrejeros de Santurce to the championship.

Olmo returned to the Series with Santurce in its 1955 title, and also played as a reinforcement for fourth-place Senadores de San Juan in 1952. Overall, Olmo posted a .303 average with three home runs and 13 RBI in three Caribbean Series.

Later years
Olmo was elected to the Caribbean Baseball Hall of Fame on February 6, 2004. His baseball career was featured in a 2008 American documentary titled "Beisbol", directed by Alan Swyer and narrated by Esai Morales, which covered the early influences and contributions of Hispanics in the game. The City of Arecibo honored Olmo by naming a stadium after him.

Olmo had been suffering from Alzheimer's disease for more than a year. Olmo, who suffered from the complications of double pneumonia, died on April 28, 2017, in Santurce, San Juan, Puerto Rico.

Notes

See also

 List of Major League Baseball annual triples leaders
 Sports in Puerto Rico
 List of Puerto Ricans

References

External links

Luis Olmo at Baseballbiography.com

1919 births
2017 deaths
Águilas Cibaeñas players
Puerto Rican expatriate baseball players in the Dominican Republic
Boston Braves players
Brooklyn Dodgers players
Cangrejeros de Santurce (baseball) players
Caribbean Series managers
Criollos de Caguas players
Deaths from Alzheimer's disease
Liga de Béisbol Profesional Roberto Clemente infielders
Liga de Béisbol Profesional Roberto Clemente outfielders
Major League Baseball infielders
Major League Baseball outfielders
Major League Baseball players from Puerto Rico
Milwaukee Braves scouts
Milwaukee Brewers (AA) players
Montreal Royals players
Philadelphia Phillies scouts
Puerto Rican expatriate baseball players in Canada
Richmond Colts players
People from Arecibo, Puerto Rico
Senadores de San Juan players
Wilson Tobs players